FilmBox is a European premium television and video on demand service owned by SPI International, a division of Canal+ Group. It owns several television channels and over-the-top media services.

History
FilmBox launched in the Czech Republic and Slovakia on 28 October 2005. In 2007 SPI International expanded the FilmBox services to Poland, followed by Romania in 2008 and other Eastern European countries in 2009.

FilmBox expanded to Western Europe by launching in the Netherlands on 3 May 2021.

Channels
 FilmBox
 FilmBox Action
 FilmBox Africa
 FilmBox Arthouse
 FilmBox Extra
 FilmBox Family
 FilmBox Premium
 FilmBox Russia
 FilmBox Stars
 HBO
 Cinemax
 Paramount Network
 AMC
 Amazon Prime Video
 Warner TV 
 TLC
 Tele 5 
 Zoom TV
 Film+
 CS Film 
 Mozi+

External links
 filmbox.com
 filmbox.nl

References

Television channels in the Netherlands
SPI International
Television channels and stations established in 2005